ShaMaran Petroleum Corp. is a Canadian independent oil development and exploration company. The company listed on the TSX Venture Exchange and the Nasdaq First North Growth Market (Stockholm) under the symbol "SNM". Founded in 2009, the Company is part of the Lundin Group, a group of individually managed public companies focused on the resource sector.

Overview 

The company is headquartered in Vancouver, British Columbia and Adel Chaouch was appointed its chief executive officer and president in 2019.  ShaMaran Petroleum began trading under the TSX Venture Exchange and started trading on Nasdaq Nordic First North Growth Market (Sweden) in June 2011 under the symbol "SNM". The dual listing made it one of First North's largest companies.

ShaMaran has a 27.6 percent interest in the Atrush Block production sharing contract, which is located in the Kurdistan Region of Iraq. It was first discovered in 2011 and oil production started in 2017. At that time, the company had announced that Kurdistan region could produce hundreds of millions of barrels of oil.

Atrush Oil Field 

The company has a 27.6% interest in the Atrush Oil Field. Atrush oil field’s production was approximately 41,273 barrels of oil per day in the 3rd quarter of 2021; The 3rd quarter lifting cost of $4.34 per barrel is an improvement to the 2021 guidance and a decrease versus 2021’s 2nd quarter due to operating efficiencies.  The third quarter of 2021 lifting costs per barrel of $4.34 is an improvement to the 2021 guidance and a 3% decrease vs second quarter 2021 lifting costs as a result of operating efficiencies.

Finances

Atrush produced an EBITDAX result of $16 million for the 3rd quarter of 2021. 9 months of 2021 totaled $48 million, over 3 times the EBITDAX of the same timeframe in 2020. The KRG continues to repay the $41.7 million of outstanding receivables from November 2019 to February 2020. At the date of this news release $20.8 million has been invoiced to the KRG and $15.8 million paid. The Company is in discussions with the KRG to offset the $6.4 million production bonus against the outstanding receivables owed to the Company.

Sarsang Acquisition

On July 12, 2021, ShaMaran signed an agreement with a subsidiary of TotalEnergies S.E. for the acquisition of TEPKRI. Under the deal, ShaMaran will purchase a 100% stake in TotalEnergies subsidiary TEPKRI Sarsang, which holds production sharing contract (PSC) interest in the Sarsang block.

The Sarsang license is expected to add around 5,000 barrels per day of light crude oil. Once the processing facility expansion is completed at the Swara Tika field, ShaMaran’s Q2 2021 average net production of around 11,090bpd is expected to double in the second half of the same year.

See also
List of petroleum companies

References

Oil companies of Canada
Companies listed on the TSX Venture Exchange
Companies based in Vancouver
Canadian companies established in 1991
1991 establishments in British Columbia